Owain Arfon Jones (born March 1955) is a Welsh police officer who was the Police and Crime Commissioner for North Wales Police from 2016 to 2021. He is a former member of Plaid Cymru.

Jones had a long career in the North Wales Police, becoming Operational Inspector for the eastern division before retiring in 2008. Jones served two full terms as county councillor for Gwersyllt West ward on Wrexham County Borough Council from 2008 until 2017. He was lead member for Children's Social Care in the Wrexham county administration led by Aled Roberts, and stood as Plaid Cymru's candidate for the Wrexham Constituency in the 2010 general election.

In December 2012, Jones was reprimanded by the Chief Executive of Wrexham County Borough Council for sending tweets from a council meeting contrary to the Council's standing orders.

Jones was elected North Wales Police and Crime Commissioner in the May 2016 election, succeeding Winston Roddick. He did not seek re-election in the May 2021 election. He was succeeded by Andy Dunbobbin of the Labour Party. Jones later said that Adam Price was not the right person to lead Plaid Cymru.

In October 2021, in the wake of Metropolitan Police officer Wayne Couzens being sentenced to life imprisonment for the murder of Sarah Everard, Jones called for an independent body to investigate domestic violence among police officers, and criticised those denying the "culture of sexism and misogyny" within the profession. He told The National Wales of his opinion that Couzens's behaviour was not unique, but rather a product of police culture. He said that senior police officers should take action against colleagues who act inappropriately.

After the fatal stabbing of Conservative MP David Amess, Jones said the stabbing was the result of a "government that divides and rules and sows hate, fear and division" and concluded people would respond violently. He later apologised for his tweet as "untimely and offensive". Two days later, Jones left Plaid Cymru after criticising the party for a "lack of strategy and a lack of success", and called for a new leader.

References

1955 births
Wrexham County Borough
Councillors in Wales
Plaid Cymru police and crime commissioners
Welsh-speaking politicians
Living people
Plaid Cymru councillors